Shirin Farhad is a 1931 Hindi language musical film. It was the second Indian film with sound. It was based on the love story from the Shahnameh of Farhad and Shirin by Nizami Ganjavi. The film was directed by J.J. Madan and starred Nissar and Jehanara Kajjan. Alam Ara was released earlier the same year and was the first Indian film with sound.

Cast 

 Nissar
 Jehanara Kajjan
 Mohamed Hussein
 Abdul Rehman Khabuli
 Sharifa

Soundtrack 
The music is written by Agha Hashar Kashmiri and composed by Brijlal Varma.

 Kirtgaar Tere Shaan Laasaane
 Pyaare-Pyaare Kya Gulkare Phasle-Bahar Aaye Hai
 Kaise Aaye Je Jo Karar, Mujhse Rutha Hai Mera Maalik
 In Kadmo Se Bandh Gaye Sheere Ke Tadbeer
 Jaau Nahar Khod Laau, Ho Madadgaar Baare, Himmat Se Jo
 Lab Pe Aahe Nahi, Shikvaa Nahi Faiyaad Nahi
 Pyaare-Pyaare Surat Ka Hoo Deewana, Zamane Se Ho Gaya Begaana
 Woh Mukkadar Na Raha, Woh Zamana Na Raha, Tum Jo Begaane Huye
 Main To Sheere Ka Hoon Deewana, Kya Cheejh Hai Jaan Gavaana
 Yaarab Na Kise Ko Ho Aazaar Mohabbat Ka
 Naseeme Subah Tu Itnaa Use Sunaa Dena
 Maseeha Tamasha Dikhaye Chala Ja, Main Martaa Hoo Tu Jalaaye Chala Ja
 Zindagi Hijra Main Hai Musibat Mujhko, Saans Lene De Jara
 Ruka Hai Dam, Har Ek Shai Saans Lene Ko Tarastee Hai
 Paaye Na Ghade Bhar Bhi Rahat Tere Chahat Mein, Naale He Rahe Lab Pe
 Kaisa Naseeb Laaye Thee Gulshane-Rojgaar Mein, Jal Gaya Baage Zindagi
 Char Din Ke Yeh Zindagani Hai, Duniya Hai Phani, Tu Dhyan Na Kar

References

External links

1931 films
1930s Hindi-language films
Indian black-and-white films
Indian musical films
1931 musical films
Works based on Shahnameh
Films based on poems
Films based on Indian folklore